The House of Scandal is a 1928 American silent drama film directed by King Baggot and starring Pat O'Malley, Dorothy Sebastian and Gino Corrado.

Cast
 Pat O'Malley as Pat Regan
 Dorothy Sebastian as Ann Rourke
 Harry Murray as Danny Regan
 Gino Corrado as Morgan
 Lee Shumway as The Butler
 Jack Singleton as A Man About Town
 Ida Darling as Mrs. Chatterton
 Lydia Knott as Mrs. Rourke

References

Bibliography
 Munden, Kenneth White. The American Film Institute Catalog of Motion Pictures Produced in the United States, Part 1. University of California Press, 1997.

External links

 

1928 films
1928 drama films
1920s English-language films
American silent feature films
Silent American drama films
American black-and-white films
Films directed by King Baggot
Tiffany Pictures films
1920s American films